Hans Meerwein (May 20, 1879 in Hamburg, Germany – October 24, 1965 in Marburg, Germany) was a German chemist. 
Several reactions and reagents bear his name, most notably the Meerwein–Ponndorf–Verley reduction, the Wagner–Meerwein rearrangement, the Meerwein arylation reaction, and Meerwein's salt.

Life and work

His father was the architect, Wilhelm Emil Meerwein. He originally trained to be a chemistry technician or 'chemotechnician' at the Fresenius University of Applied Sciences (between 1898 and 1900) before studying for a chemistry degree at the University of Bonn. After finishing his PhD with Richard Anschütz he worked at the University of Berlin, before returning to Bonn where he became professor in 1914. From 1922 till 1928 he was professor for organic chemistry at the University of Königsberg. The last change in his academic career was to the University of Marburg. The war devastated the Institute and Meerwein was planning the rebuilding which was finished in 1953, the year he retired from lecturing. He conducted experimental work with the help of two postdocs until his death in 1965.

His greatest impact upon organic chemistry was to propose the carbocation 2 as a reactive intermediate, originally as a rationalization of the racemization of  isobornyl chloride 1 catalysed by a Lewis acid such as SnCl4. His proposed mechanism for racemization involved a subsequent [2,6] hydride transfer, which allows the carbocation to be located at either of these two symmetric positions. An alternative mechanism—a [1,2] methyl migration, a type of reaction now known as a Wagner–Meerwein shift—was in fact suggested for the first time by Josef Houben and Pfankuch.

Awards
1959 Otto Hahn Prize for Chemistry and Physics

References

External links
Honors for Meerwein in Marburg
biography at chemlin

1879 births
1965 deaths
20th-century German chemists
University of Bonn alumni
Academic staff of the University of Bonn
Commanders Crosses of the Order of Merit of the Federal Republic of Germany
Scientists from Hamburg